is a Japanese manga series written and illustrated by Marimo Ragawa. It was published in Hakusensha's magazine Hana to Yume from 1991 to 1997. In North America, it was published by Viz Media. The series was adapted into an anime television series in 1996.

As of November 2021, the manga had over 17.7 million copies in circulation. In 1995, Baby & Me received the 40th Shogakukan Manga Award in the shōjo category.

Plot
Takuya Enoki loses his mother, Yukako, when she dies in a car accident. Takuya now lives with his father, Harumi, and his baby brother, Minoru. Takuya's baby brother is only two years old and requires much care. Although Takuya is only a fifth grader, he cooks, cleans, sews, scolds, and does everything that is normally a mother's job. Between his housework and looking after his baby brother, Takuya begins to feel a helpless gap between his friends who have fun every day after school. The Kimura family blame him for Minoru's constant crying. His stress gradually builds up and bursts at a point. Because of a mistake Minoru made, Takuya reacts violently. He cannot help feeling upset over Minoru, who is stressing him and taking up all his time.

One day, when Takuya picks Minoru up from preschool, he starts to walk faster imagining what it would be like to leave his little brother behind him. But soon, Takuya realizes what he has done and runs back. He finds Minoru with his eyes full of tears and a brutal dog is blocking Minoru's way. Takuya dashes in full speed and saves his little brother. After coming home and seeing Minoru sobbing, Takuya realizes that Minoru cries because he is just lonely and becomes ashamed of himself. From then on, Takuya learns to love his little brother as family and his long life story of being a mother and a brother at once begins.

Characters

Enoki family

The elder brother. 12 years old. Has taken up the burden of mothering his younger brother, Minoru.  Due to his gentle, calm demeanor, good look and good grade, he is popular with the girls at school. Most likely to be mad when someone hurts or scares Minoru. 
He is kind, caring, hard working, responsible and sensitive though oblivious of the girls' feelings towards him.
He is also good at short distance run. However, he's really bad at long running and handicraft.
In Valentine day, he receives 9 boxes of chocolate. In the long run, he comes up at 3rd place thanks to his extreme effort.

Baby of the family. Super cute. Loved and over protected by his older brother, Takuya. Loves to wear a bear hat. His favorite character is Zap, a superhero from a laundry detergent commercial. His hero in life is Takuya.
He is of the same class as Hiro. Both Hiro and Ichika loves him.

The father of Takuya and Minoru. He works hard to feed his family. He is a system engineer. He is really handsome and is popular in his company.
He deeply cares for his two sons.

Deceased mother of Takuya and Minoru. Married Harumi against her family's wishes, and escaped her family in doing so. 
She first met her husband when she was working part-time at a bento shop. 
Her parents died in an accident when she was 10.

Friends

Classmate of Takuya's. Nicknamed Gon. Is the older brother in his family, with Hiroko (Hiro), his younger sister. Is the opposite of Takuya in many ways, especially his care towards Hiro and his look. Greedy and lazy. His family opens a grocery store, and he often works there. Though Gon's crush likes Takuya, he still likes Takuya as a friend.

Younger sister of Tadashi. Has the exact same face as her brother. Same class as Minoru. She has a crush on Minoru after he saves her from a dog.
She often fights with love rival, Ichika. Was first thought to be a boy. She sees Minoru as brave and handsome. Plays roughly.

Rich classmate of Takuya's. Stuck up because he is rich. Wears expensive designer clothes. He often ridicules Takuya and fights with Gon (whom he dislikes). His grandmother Hanae considers Gon's grandmother her love rival in the past (and vice versa).

Fujii family

Oldest daughter in the family. She is in charge of the other siblings when Parents are at work and looking after the house. She has a boyfriend.

Oldest son, second-oldest child in the Fujii family. 17 years old. Dirty-minded.
He is loud, positive and popular at school. 

Second-oldest daughter, third child in the Fujii family. 15 years old. Has a cold voice and personality. Her crush is Sakamaki, an introverted boy obsessing with audio visual. 
She's jealous of Tomoya's cheerful personality.

Classmate of Takuya's. Is the fourth brother in his family of two older sisters, an older brother, a younger sister, and a younger brother. Competitive. 
He is deemed "cool" in class, mostly because it is hard to know what he is thinking. Poor because he has to share everything with his other siblings. Often stuck taking care of his younger siblings.
He is good looking and intelligent. He is also good at sports and is popular at school.

In Valentine's Day, he receives 7 box of chocolate. He wins the 1st prize for the long run competition.

Younger sister of Akihiro's. Different class from Minoru. She has a crush on Minoru and often fights (verbal and physically) with love rival, Hiro. She is highly intelligent and sees Minoru as cute. Sharp tongued.

Youngest son, sixth child, and youngest child in the Fujii family. Though younger than Minoru, his vocabulary is better than Minoru's. Also very intelligent.
Because of his gentle personality, he is often controlled by Ichika.

Neighbors
The KimurasLives across the street from the Enoki's. Though both are old, they are very spirited. Their son recently came home.
Seiichi Kimura : the only son.  He had a bad reputation, so he ran away from home to another city, and when he came back it turned out that he had married and had a son.

Tomoko Kimura : Seiichi's wife.

Taichi Kimura : son of Seiichi.

Others

A girl in Takuya's class. She has a quick temper. Her reputation as a liar makes it hard for her to have friends. She often speaks too honestly, and words come out of her mouth before she thinks it through, leading her to hurt other's feelings without meaning to.

Gon's crush. She is the class representative of Class 6-3. Takuya thinks she is weird. Gon probably likes her because she is pretty. She likes to dress very extravagantly (weird by Takuya's taste). On her date with Gon, she chose to go to the kiddie rides. She sexually harasses Takuya and Gon by patting their behinds. When Takuya asked her to go on a date with Gon (from Gon's orders) she told him that she liked someone else. After her date with Gon, she confesses to him that she liked Takuya. She commented to Takuya that she knew he would not tell Gon because he wants to protect his friends.

Media
  published in March 1992
  published in August 1992
  published in December 1992
  published in February 1993
  published in June 1993
  published in November 1993
  published in March 1994
  published in July 1994
  published in November 1994
  published in February 1992
  published in May 1995
  published in September 1995
  published in January 1996
  published in July 1996
  published in November 1996
  published in March 1997
  published in June 1997
  published in September 1997

Episodes

Reception
Baby & Me won the 40th Shogakukan Manga Award in the shōjo category in 1995. As of November 2021, the manga had over 17.7 million copies in circulation.

References

External links

  at Viz Media
 

1991 manga
1996 anime television series debuts
1997 Japanese television series endings
Anime series based on manga
Drama anime and manga
Hakusensha manga
Hakusensha franchises
Manga adapted into television series
Pierrot (company)
Shōjo manga
Slice of life anime and manga
TV Tokyo original programming
Viz Media manga
Winners of the Shogakukan Manga Award for shōjo manga